State Route 590 (SR 590) is a north–south state highway in the northwestern portion of the U.S. state of Ohio. The southern terminus of SR 590 is at a signalized intersection with SR 12 in the village of Bettsville.

Route description
Along its path, SR 590 travels through portions of Seneca, Sandusky and Ottawa Counties.  No portion of the highway is included as a part of the National Highway System.

History
SR 590 was created in 1937.  Its original routing consisted of the following: the current SR 53 from its intersection with Seneca County Road 51 southwest of the unincorporated community of Old Fort to its intersection with Seneca CR 61; CR 61 from SR 53 to the current southern terminus of SR 590 at SR 12 in Bettsville; and the entirety of the current routing of SR 590.  The portions of current SR 53 and CR 61 noted would only be designated as SR 590 for one year.  In 1938, SR 590 was truncated to its current southern terminus at SR 12, and the portion east of Bettsville would become part of re-routing of SR 113.

Major intersections

References

590
Transportation in Seneca County, Ohio
Transportation in Sandusky County, Ohio
Transportation in Ottawa County, Ohio